The Princess of New York is a 1921 British crime film directed by Donald Crisp. Alfred Hitchcock is credited as a title designer. The film is now considered a lost film.

Cast
 David Powell - Geoffrey Kingsward
 Mary Glynne - Helen Stanton
 Saba Raleigh - Mrs. Raffan
 George Bellamy - Sir George Meretham
 Dorothy Fane - Violet Meretham
 Ivo Dawson - Allan Meretham
 Philip Hewland - Colonel Kingsward
 R. Heaton Grey - Mr. Greet
 Wyndham Guise - Eardley Smith (as Windham Guise)
 Jane West - Mrs. Eardley Smith
 H. Lloyd - Moneylender
 Lionel Yorke - Reddish
 William Parry - Magistrate

See also
Alfred Hitchcock filmography
List of lost films

References

External links

The Princess of New York at SilentEra

1921 films
1921 crime films
1921 lost films
British silent feature films
British black-and-white films
British crime films
Films directed by Donald Crisp
Films based on British novels
Lost British films
Lost crime films
1920s British films
Paramount Pictures films
Islington Studios films